The Special Committee on the Financial, Economic and Social Crisis (CRIS) was a special committee of the European Parliament. It was created in October 2009 to assess the fallout from the great financial crisis and make recommendations to prevent a similar upheaval. A significant resolution was adopted in October 2010. It is codified in what is known as a mid-term report, however, because the mandate was extended to July 2011. Then, a final resolution was adopted. The work of the committee is important in relation to drafting policy in the areas of EU financial supervision and  governance, in the context of the European sovereign debt crisis.

Members

See also
 Wall Street and the Financial Crisis: Anatomy of a Financial Collapse
 European System of Financial Supervisors
 Committees of the European Parliament

References

External links
 CRIS' official webpage
 The CRIS final report
 Wolf Klinz interviewed in October 2009 

Economic